This is a list of francophone communities in the Canadian province of Ontario.  Municipalities with a high percentage of French-speakers in Ontario are listed.

The provincial average of Ontarians whose mother tongue is French is 4.1%, with a total of 549,000 people in Ontario who identify French as their mother tongue in 2016.  The majority of francophones in Ontario live in eastern and northeastern Ontario.  While most communities in these areas have sizeable French minorities, several municipalities have francophone majorities.

Most such places are designated as French language service areas under the provincial French Language Services Act, meaning that provincial government services must be available in French.

A number of small municipalities also have high francophone populations.  These include the francophone-majority municipalities of Carlsbad Springs (84%), Casey (71%), Dubreuilville (82%), Fauquier-Strickland (78%), Mattice-Val Côté (90%), McGarry (63%), Opasatika (85%), and Val Rita-Harty (80%).  Unorganized North Cochrane District also has a French-speaking majority (64%).

Small francophone-minority municipalities include Baldwin (16%), Brethour (9%), Calvin (14%), Coleman (15%), Evanturel (13%), Essa (6%), Gauthier (8%), Harley (40%), Harris (39%), Hornepayne (14%), Hilliard (19%), Hudson (18%), James (45%), Kerns (11%), Killarney (13%), Larder Lake (34%), Matachewan (27%), Mattawan (15%), Nairn and Hyman (14%), Temagami (9%), The North Shore (22%), Papineau-Cameron (26%), Thornloe (33%), and White River (18%).

There are also a few small unincorporated communities (governed by local service boards) in Northeastern Ontario with sizeable francophone communities. These include Cartier (29%), Foleyet (26%), Gogama (56%), Jogues (91%), Sultan (40%) and Thorne (43%).

See also
Franco-Ontarian
List of townships in Ontario
Francophone Association of Municipalities of Ontario

References

Francophone